Tary is a rural locality (a khutor) in Avilovskoye Rural Settlement, Ilovlinsky District, Volgograd Oblast, Russia. The population was 301 as of 2010. There are 10 streets.

Geography 
Tary is located in steppe, on the right bank of the Ilovlya River, 9 km north of Ilovlya (the district's administrative centre) by road. Avilov is the nearest rural locality.

References 

Rural localities in Ilovlinsky District